Silhouette (Silhouette Chord) is a fictional character, a superheroine appearing in American comic books published by Marvel Comics. She first appeared in New Warriors #2 (August 1990), and was created by Fabian Nicieza and Mark Bagley. 

Silhouette and her brother Aaron Chord (Midnight's Fire) are mutants with magical powers gained from the bloodline of their mother, a member of a temple cult in Southeast Asia who married an African-American soldier from the Vietnam War. She manipulates the Darkforce, having the power to teleport, hide in shadows, and more.  She is also a paraplegic, having been paralyzed from the waist down by a bullet injury sustained tracking drug gangs early in her career.

Fictional character biography

Origin
In 1966 during the Vietnam War, an American recon patrol in Cambodia stumbled upon an ancient hidden temple of a cult known as the Dragon's Breath, which had remained hidden for centuries. It had been built upon a well-spring of raw, primal energy called the "Well of All Things." The inhabitants decided to breed a superior race that would one day unite with the ways of the west. They believed that this union would produce children capable of harnessing the power of the Well. The members of the recon patrol were to be the fathers of these children; one of these men was Andrew Chord, the man who would become Silhouette's father.

Midnight's Fire/Paralyzed
Silhouette and her brother Aaron (Midnight's Fire) are the only children of Andrew Chord, the former guardian of Dwayne Taylor (Night Thrasher) and his wife Miyami (Tai's only daughter), and were born in New York City. Silhouette and Midnight's Fire were operating as independent vigilantes in the streets of New York, when they met Dwayne (before he had become Night Thrasher), and the three began an organized effort to take down various New York City criminal street gangs. She began a romance with Night Thrasher during this time.

This partnership ended when Silhouette was shot by police gunfire and paralyzed from the legs down in a sting gone wrong. Midnight's Fire blamed Dwayne, becoming a cop killer and druglord in order to lure Dwayne into a physical confrontation he could not possibly win, and Silhouette ultimately turned away from Midnight's Fire. Later the partially paralyzed Silhouette reunited with Dwayne, distancing herself from her brother's evil actions.

Years later, Silhouette fought the Bengal, and sought aid from the New Warriors. Upon reuniting with Dwayne, she revealed her "shadow-melting" power to him. She was attacked by the Punisher, but made peace with him. With the New Warriors, she battled the White Queen and the Hellions. Silhouette then joins with the New Warriors as an adventurer full-time. The problem with her loss of clothes caused by her shadow powers is solved by the illegal use of unstable molecules for her costume. She first clashed with Psionex, and then with the New Warriors and the Fantastic Four, battled Terrax. Silhouette helped Night Thrasher investigate corruption in the Taylor Foundation, and witnessed Chord's suicide attempt. With the New Warriors, she was captured by Gideon, and then first battled the Sphinx. Reed Richards, the owner of the patent for unstable molecules, gives his personal blessing for her to use them because he understands the heroic work the New Warriors do.

Folding Circle and the Infinity Crusade
Diego Casseas, one of the other members of the recon patrol, now calling himself the Left Hand, stole the power of the Well from his own child, then gathered the other children of the pact into a group called the Folding Circle. The Circle attempted to take control of the Well away from Tai. Members of the Circle, together with the New Warriors, managed to defeat Tai, but the Well was sealed, Casseas and Tai were apparently killed, and the surviving members of the Circle escaped in a stolen Avengers' Quinjet.

The remaining members of the Folding Circle later crashed in Madripoor and attempted to usurp the role of local drug-lord. They succeeded, but were later taken down by Night Thrasher and Silhouette.

It was around this time Silhouette became the brainwashed assistant/bodyguard to the cosmic villain Goddess in the limited series Infinity Crusade. She saves most of the cosmos from the power-mad fantasies of Pip the Troll, unfortunately just in time for the homicidal fantasies of the Goddess to prevail. The Goddess ends up defeated by other forces.

Relationships
For a time, Silhouette and Night Thrasher were lovers; in fact, Dwayne had been in love with her for a very long time, but his anger and single-minded obsession with his "mission" eventually pushed her away. Silhouette later hooked up with Dwayne's half-brother Bandit, and they both left the team.

Silhouette and Bandit moved to Chicago together, and for a long time, nothing was heard from either of them until Bandit showed up in New Orleans, attempting to con Belladonna into helping him destroy the Thieves Guild. It is during this story that Gambit reveals the fact that Bandit and Silhouette are still together, and that he was only manipulating Belladonna. The Guild was destroyed and Bandit left New Orleans and presumably returned to Chicago.

Universal Wellspring
Silhouette is a mutant like her brother Midnight's Fire but unlike her grandmother Tai who derived powers from the Universal Wellspring.

Civil War
Silhouette is seen as a member of Captain America's "Secret Avengers," declaring her stance against the Superhuman Registration Act. Silhouette is part of the backup team when Iron Man wants to meet Captain America on the field at Yankee Stadium, at night when it is empty. During the meeting, all the stadium's lights turn on at once. While Ultra Girl, Spider-Man and Luke Cage attack Iron Man, Silhouette takes Captain America away via the shadows.

Silhouette has been identified as one of the 142 registered superheroes who have registered after the Civil War.

She later confronts the 'new' Night Thrasher about his new set-up of the New Warriors and finds out he is in fact Bandit.

Powers and abilities
Thanks to her genetic heritage developed through many generations of selective breeding, Silhouette has the ability to teleport herself over short distances on Earth by traveling through the Darkforce Dimension. She can "melt" into any shadow or area of darkness, thus entering the Darkforce dimension, and then reemerge on Earth through another shadow or area of darkness.

Silhouette originally had the power to shadow-meld, thereby becoming nearly invisible while under the cover of darkness, as well as the ability to teleport via dimension hop, using any available shadow as a portal. She could also open small portals anywhere shadows existed and use them to attack distant enemies by extending her crutches through them.

After a disturbance in the Darkforce that affected everyone who used it, she found that her powers had increased to the point where she could now teleport others. She has demonstrated this ability by teleporting small groups of people along with herself, although it is painful and leaves her exhausted. She can also now become 'living darkness', and can cause extreme pain by phasing through the bodies of her enemies.

Like her brother Midnight's Fire, Silhouette also has enhanced speed, strength, agility, and sensory perception. She is a superb hand-to-hand combatant and capable martial artist, and master of an unspecified martial art.

Later in New Warriors (Vol 4) she now has the ability to manipulate the dark force energies to create tendrils much in the same manner as Asylum, another Darkforce user.

Equipment
After she became disabled due to injuries inflicted by gunfire, Night Thrasher designed and built a special pair of combat-capable crutches and leg braces for her. Night Thrasher designed the crutches to include both a hidden electric taser that can emit electrical charges to stun an adversary, and a slim anesthetic needle injector that delivered paralytic chemicals. The crutches are also equipped with "smoke gas" and metal firing pellets.

A later design had retractable braces in specially designed open metal gauntlets.

She wears a costume made from unstable molecules, because initially she could only teleport herself and any inanimate matter composed of unstable molecules; therefore, her clothes fell off whenever she shadow-melded.

References

External links
 World of Black Heroes: Silhouette Chord Biography
The New Warriors

African-American superheroes
Asian-American superheroes
Characters created by Fabian Nicieza
Characters created by Mark Bagley
Comics characters introduced in 1990
Marvel Comics characters who can teleport
Marvel Comics martial artists
Marvel Comics mutates
Marvel Comics female superheroes